Windsor Castle is a castle in Windsor, one of the seats of the British Royal Family.

Windsor Castle or Windsor Palace may also refer to:

Buildings
Windsor Castle, Kensington, a public house in London
Windsor Castle, Maida Vale, a public house in London
Windsor Palace (Thailand), a former palace in Bangkok, Thailand

Places
Windsor Castle, Pennsylvania, an unincorporated community in Pennsylvania, USA
Windsor Castle (Smithfield, Virginia), listed on the National Register of Historic Places in Isle of Wight County, Virginia
Windsor Castle (Toano, Virginia), listed on the National Register of Historic Places listings in James City County, Virginia

Vehicles
  – one of six ships of the Royal Navy
  – one of several merchant or passenger ships of that name
 Windsor Castle, one of the GWR 3031 Class locomotives that were built for and run on the Great Western Railway between 1891 and 1915

Other uses
 Windsor Castle (novel), a novel by William Harrison Ainsworth serially published in 1842
Castle Windsor, part of the Castle Project (an open source application framework)

See also
 Windsor (disambiguation)